Shambhavi School of Dance was established in 1993 in Kengeri, Bangalore, Karnataka, India as a Gurukul for the study and practice of Indian classical dance and music. The Artistic Director of this school is Smt.Vyjayanthi Kashi who is an exponent in Kuchipudi dance form.

Activities

To cultivate and nurture the culture of Indian Arts, Shambhavi School of Dance create a common canvas for artists of past, present and future. They utilize the advanced technology of today's era to share their knowledge, experiences, emotions and feelings through the ancient art forms. 

They offer introductory courses (short and long term), diploma course and advanced course in various subjects like Indian Classical Dance, dance theory, music, yoga, and dance therapy for the students. The school conducts workshops, lecture demonstrations and choreography for annual days in Education of arts in schools, non-governmental organizations, and other institutions. The Shambhavi Dance Ensemble has performed across India.

Achievements

 Shambhavi School of Dance every year organises "Dance Jathre"-India's first ever International Dance Fair where workshops are conducted on Various Dance forms by concerned exponents in that dance forms and also performances by various artists all over India.
 Shambhavi School of Dance organised "Nayika- Excellence Personified" on the occasion of International Women's Day which includes a seminar on "Contribution of women to Kuchipudi" and also "Natya Shastra" Award was conferred to legendary Dansuse Padma Bhushan Dr. Yamini Krishnamurthy.
 World Dance Day Celebrations 2016

References

External links

Official website
Shambhavi School of Dance

Dance schools in India
Educational institutions established in 1993
Tourist attractions in Bangalore
1993 establishments in Karnataka